On 3 May 2007, an election was held to elect councillors to the North Warwickshire Borough Council on the same day as other local elections in the UK. It resulted in the Conservative Party gaining control of the council. The previous election resulted in no overall control with the Labour Party having the highest number of seats at 16.

All 35 seats from all wards were up for election, with 18 seats needed for an overall majority. The Conservatives won 21 seats, with Labour winning the remaining 14. The Liberal Democrats lost all four of their seats.

References

2007 English local elections
2007
2000s in Warwickshire